Colossendeis colossea is a species  of sea spider (class Pycnogonida) in the family Colossendeidae. The species was first described by Wilson in 1881.

References

Pycnogonids

Animals described in 1881